Youssef Msakni (born 28 October 1990) is a Tunisian professional footballer who plays as a winger or forward for Qatar Stars League club Al Arabi, on loan from Al-Duhail, and the Tunisia national team.

Msakni has played 90 matches and scored 17 goals for Tunisia.

Club career

ES Tunis
Having spent his youth career Stade Tunisien, Msakni moved to Espérance Sportive de Tunis in July 2008.

He played his first game with ES Tunis on 26 July 2009, on the first day of the 2009–10 season, against Olympique Béja. He entered the field in the 79th minute of play in replacement of Henri Bienvenu Ntsama. Two weeks later, on 8 August, Msakni scored his first league goal in his third game against AS Kasserine in the 54th minute of play of a 4–0 win.

On 12 November 2011, he won the CAF Champions League, finishing second in the competition with five goals, just behind Wydad Casablanca striker Fabrice Ondama, who scored six goals.

On 30 September 2012, he won the Tunisian Ligue Professionnelle 1 for the fourth time, winning the title of best scorer in the Tunisian football championship with 17 goals. According to Goal.com, Msakni was the 48th best footballer of the 2012 season in all countries, thanks in particular to the performances realized under the colors of his club or the national team. During the transfer period, he was courted by many French clubs, including Paris Saint-Germain, Lille OSC, AS Monaco and FC Lorient, but on 3 July 2012 the attacking midfielder signed on a four-year contract with Qatari Stars League club Lekhwiya SC, but he joined the club on 1 January 2013.

Lekhwiya and Al Duhail
On 1 January 2013, Msakni became a player of Qatari club Lekhwiya SC for a period of four and a half years; the total amount of the transfer was 23 million dinars (€11.5 million), a record for an African player.

On 10 February, he scored his first goal in the 28th minute, with his team winning 4–0 against Al-Wakrah SC. On 26 February, Msakni proved decisive in the AFC Champions League with a free-kick in the 33rd minute, allowing his team to win 2–1. In March 2013, Msakni was reportedly coveted by four English clubs: Newcastle United, Arsenal, Everton and Tottenham. This growing interest pushed the Qatari club leaders to review the player's release clause by increasing his price. On 4 May, he won the 2013 Qatar Crown Prince Cup against the Al Sadd after scoring his team's third goal in a 3–2 win.

A complicated start to the 2013–14 season, during which he scored 7 goals in 12 league games, the Qatari media linked him with a departure to Ukrainian champions Shakhtar Donetsk.

The start of the Asian campaign begins on 8 February 2014 for Msakni and his team-mates: they opposed the Bahraini team Hidd SCC in the second round of the 2014 AFC Champions League; they won the match 2–1, including a decisive pass from the Tunisian striker. A week later, Lekhwiya SC competed in the third preliminary round of the same competition against Kuwaiti club Kuwait SC, where two of his team-mates in Tunisia, Issam Jemâa and Chadi Hammami played. Msakni scored a goal and delivered two assists.

After the team changed its name from Lekhwiya to Al Duhail, he received offers from Olympique de Marseille and teams playing La Liga but he preferred to stay in Qatar and play in Europe after 2018 FIFA World Cup.

On 8 April 2018, it was reported that Msakni would miss this summer's World Cup in Russia after being ruled out for six months because of a knee injury.

Msakni was linked with a move to Premier League club Brighton & Hove Albion in December 2018. In January 2019 he moved on loan to Belgian First Division A side K.A.S. Eupen.

International career
On 14 December 2009, he received his first call-up to the Tunisia national team from coach Faouzi Benzarti for a friendly against Gambia in preparation for the 2010 Africa Cup of Nations. On 9 January 2010, at Stade El Menzah. He entered the field in the 35th minute following Oussama Darragi's injury.

On 25 February 2011, he won the CHAN with Tunisia on a 3–0 victory over Angola; he scored a single goal during this competition, against Angola but this time in the group stage.

On 7 October 2017, Msakni scored a hat-trick against Guinea in the 2018 World Cup qualifiers.

CAN 2010
Msakni played his first Africa Cup of Nations at only 19 years old and held a place in the Benzarti squad. In the first match, against Zambia, he delivered a decisive pass to Zouheir Dhaouadi, offering him the goal of the equalizer. He was one of the players in the match against Gabon, and was replaced in the 67th minute by Chaouki Ben Saada. However, he did not participate in the elimination of his team against Cameroon.

CAN 2012
In the first game against Morocco, he scored in the 75th minute of play by eliminating two opponents, dribbling them one after the other before striking a cross hit of the right, which allowed Tunisia to win the match 2–1. In the second game against Niger, he opened the score in the fourth minute of play by passing through three opponents before entering the surface and scoring right; Tunisia took a 2–1 lead and qualified for the quarter-finals of the 2012 Africa Cup of Nations. The third match was difficult for Tunisia and lost 0–1 against Gabon. The quarter-finals between Tunisia and Ghana when Tunisia was eliminated from the competition.

CAN 2013
Following a difficult qualification at 2013 Africa Cup of Nations against Sierra Leone, Msakni was a part of the group in South Africa. On 22 January, in the first match of Group D against Algeria, he scored in the 90th minute by undoing a 25-meter rolled strike that is lodged in the goal of Raïs M'Bolhi, allowing Tunisians to win the match 1–0). He e was elected as the man of the match and the scorer of the most beautiful goal of the competition. Once again in the second match, Msakni and his team-mates lost 0–3 against the Ivory Coast. In the last game of group stage, Tunisia drew 1–1 with Togo and finished third in Group D.

CAN 2015
Msakni took part in the 2015 Africa Cup of Nations in Equatorial Guinea, where he played in the first match against Cape Verde replacing Wahbi Khazri in the 82nd minute. He played the full match of his team's 2–1 win against Zambia. He was a substitute at the last match in the group stage against DR Congo replacing Mohamed Ali Yacoubi in the 104th minute in extra time against Equatorial Guinea in the quarter-finals. Tunisia lost 1–2.

CAN 2017
Msakni played a major role in qualifying for the tournament after scoring against Togo in Monastir. He was also one of the leading players in the group stage after delivering an assist against Algeria in the 50th minute which they won 2–1 and scoring a goal against Zimbabwe in the 22nd minute of a 4–2 win. Tunisia was eliminated in the quarter-finals against Burkina Faso after losing 0–2.

Personal life
Msakni is the younger brother of fellow Tunisian international Iheb, and he is the son of former Stade Tunisien player Mondher Msakni.

On 4 July 2017, Msakni married the Tunisian actress and fashion model Amira Jaziri. But in 2021, Amira and the Tunisian player separated.

Career statistics

Club

International

Scores and results list Tunisia's goal tally first, score column indicates score after each Msakni goal.

Honours 
Tunisia
Kirin Cup: 2022
FIFA Arab Cup runner-up: 2021
Africa Cup of Nations fourth place: 2019

Qatar
Qatar Stars League: Best player 2017-2018

References

External links
 

1990 births
Living people
Association football wingers
Association football forwards
Tunisian footballers
Tunisia international footballers
Tunisian Ligue Professionnelle 1 players
Qatar Stars League players
Stade Tunisien players
Espérance Sportive de Tunis players
Belgian Pro League players
Lekhwiya SC players
Al-Duhail SC players
K.A.S. Eupen players
Al-Arabi SC (Qatar) players
2010 Africa Cup of Nations players
2011 African Nations Championship players
2012 Africa Cup of Nations players
2013 Africa Cup of Nations players
2015 Africa Cup of Nations players
2017 Africa Cup of Nations players
2019 Africa Cup of Nations players
2021 Africa Cup of Nations players
Tunisian expatriate footballers
Tunisian expatriate sportspeople in Qatar
Expatriate footballers in Qatar
Tunisian expatriate sportspeople in Belgium
Expatriate footballers in Belgium
Tunisia A' international footballers
Footballers from Tunis
2022 FIFA World Cup players